This is a list of Colorado suffragists, suffrage groups and others associated with the cause of women's suffrage in Colorado.

Groups 

 City League of Denver
Colorado Equal Suffrage Association, formed in 1881.
Colorado Non-Partisan Suffrage Association
Colored Woman's Suffrage Association
Congressional Union for Woman Suffrage, later the National Woman's Party
Fort Collins Equal Suffrage Association, formed in 1881.
Territorial Woman Suffrage Society (also Colorado Woman Suffrage Society), formed in 1876.
Woman's Christian Temperance Union (WCTU)
Young Women's League

Suffragists 

 Frances Wisebart Jacobs (Denver)
Theodosia Ammons (Denver)
Berthe Louise Arnold (Colorado Springs)
Virginia Arnold (Colorado Springs)
Alida Avery (Denver)
Mary B. Bates
Elsie Lincoln Benedict
 Louie Croft Boyd
Mary C. C. Bradford (Denver)
 Margaret Brown
Margaret W. Campbell
 Caroline Nichols Churchill (Denver)
Sarah Jane Leffingwell Corbin (Fort Collins)
Amy K. Cornwall
Ray David (Denver)
 Sarah Platt-Decker
 Elizabeth Ensley
Mary L. Geffs
Natalie Gray (Colorado Springs)
Olive Hogle
 Julia Archibald Holmes
Katherine Tipton Hosmer (Springfield)
Margaret W. Kessler (Denver)
Lucy McIntyre (Fort Collins)
 Ellis Meredith
Mildred Morris (Denver)
Grace Espy Patton (Fort Collins)
Martha A. Pease
 Elizabeth Eyre Pellett
Minnie J. Reynolds (Denver)
 Helen Ring Robinson
 Eliza Pickrell Routt
 Hazel Schmoll
 Caroline Spencer (Colorado Springs)
Isaac N. Stevens
 Elizabeth Hickok Robbins Stone (Fort Collins)
 Baby Doe Tabor (Leadville and Denver)
Mary Jewett Telford
Louise M. Tyler (Denver)
Albina Washburn (Loveland)
Eliza Tupper Wilkes (Colorado Springs)

Politicians supporting women's suffrage 

Lucas Brandt (Larimer County)
Henry P. Bromwell (Denver)
Jared L. Brush
Allison H. DeFrance (Jefferson County)
John Evans
Omar E. Garwood (Denver)
Silas Haynes (Weld County)
 Edward McCook
John Long Routt
 Amos Steck
Agapito Vigil
Davis Hanson Waite
Abram Young (Jefferson County)

Publications 

 The Colorado Antelope, founded in 1879, later known as the Queen Bee in 1882.
The Colorado Woman.

Suffragists campaigning in Colorado 

 Susan B. Anthony
Mary Grafton Campbell
Carrie Chapman Catt
Laura Ormiston Chant
Susan S. Fessenden
Matilda Hindman
Therese A. Jenkins
Anne Henrietta Martin
Ruth Astor Noyes
Lucy Stone

Antisuffragists 

Joseph Projectus Machebeuf (Denver)

See also 

 Timeline of women's suffrage in Colorado
 Women's suffrage in Colorado
 Women's suffrage in states of the United States
 Women's suffrage in the United States

References

Sources 

 

Colorado suffrage

Colorado suffragists
Activists from Colorado
History of Colorado
suffragists